Liebert Corporation is a global manufacturer of power, precision cooling and infrastructure management systems for mainframe computer, server racks, and critical process systems. A subsidiary of Vertiv, It is headquartered in Westerville, Ohio, and employs more than 1,800 people across 12 manufacturing plants worldwide.

History

Founded by Ralph C. Liebert (1918-1984) as Capitol Refrigeration Industries in 1946, Liebert Corporation was formed in 1965 as the industry's first designer and manufacturer of computer room air conditioning (CRAC) systems. Targeted to the mainframe computer data-processing market, Liebert CRAC systems were the first totally redundant, self-contained units capable of maintaining air temperature, humidity and air quality within the precision tolerances necessary for media and equipment used in these rooms and taking advantage of the raised floor plenums typically found in such rooms.

In 1977, Liebert launched a partner company named Conditioned Power Corporation to design and manufacture power distribution, conditioning and monitoring systems for the data processing industry. The company remained a wholly owned subsidiary until 1981, when it became a division of Liebert Corporation upon the company's initial public offering. The company strengthened this division in 1983 with the acquisition of Franklin Electric subsidiary Programmed Power Corporation. The acquisition expanded the capabilities of the company's power division to include the design and manufacture of uninterruptible power supplies.

Liebert Corporation was acquired by Emerson Electric Co. of St. Louis, Missouri in 1987. The company remained a wholly owned subsidiary of Emerson until 2000, when the company consolidated its network and computer protection businesses to form its Emerson Network Power platform group. As part of the Emerson Network Power platform, the Liebert and Liebert Services businesses offer power, cooling, monitoring and management stuff for critical data center applications, as well as professional services.

Liebert products 
AC Power Systems:  Uninterruptible power systems and associated power distribution equipment and enclosures.
Categories:  Desktop/Workstation; Rackmount; Network; Large Facility; Power Distribution and Conditioning; Rack-Based PDU
Precision Cooling Equipment: 
Categories: High-Density Modular, Small Room, Large Room, Telecom, Industrial, Heat Rejection, Economizer 
Server Racks and Integrated Cabinets: Standard and customized integrated cabinets with self-contained air conditioning, UPS and wiring management. 
Categories: Indoor Racks and Accessories; Aisle Containment; Bundles; High-Density Cooling Integrated
Infrastructure Management: including monitoring software and services.

Liebert Services Business 
Emerson Network Power's Liebert Services business was formed in 1985 as Liebert Global Services, a business unit of Liebert Corporation. The business currently employs more than 350 customer engineers to support more than 35,000 clients in more than 70 countries.

Emerson Network Power Liebert Services specializes in network reliability programs including design, engineering, installation, project management and on-site operations management, preventive maintenance and energy-consumption monitoring for data centers, telecom networks and other mission-critical applications.

Specific professional service categories include:
Business-Critical Services
Data Center Availability Assessments, UPS Service, Battery Service, Precision Cooling Service, Enterprise Remote Monitoring
Professional Account Management
Customer Relationship Management (CRM), Customer Service Networks, Customer Resolution Centers

References

Computer companies of the United States
Cooling technology
Manufacturing companies based in Ohio
Computer companies established in 1965
1965 establishments in Ohio